was a Japanese historian. He is best known for his work on historical records pertaining to the ancient and Middle Ages of Japanese history.

Background

Takeuchi sik born in Aichi Prefecture on December 20, 1907. He graduated from the Tōkyō Imperial University in 1930 where he studied Japanese history.

Career

Upon graduation, he began work at the Historiographical Institute of the Imperial University of Tokyo, where he eventually became the director in 1965.

He taught at the Kyūshū University, the Historiographical Institute of the University of Tokyo, and Waseda University.

Takeuchi's research focused on temple economic systems, Heian period shōen, and political history of the Ritsuryō state.

Over the course of his career, Takeuchi was awarded several awards for his many contributions to research:
 Asahi Culture Prize, 1957
 Purple Medal Ribbon, 1969
 Order of the Rising Sun, 1978
 Person of Cultural Merit, 1988
 Order of Culture in 1996

Major works

Takeuchi's research produced a number of major books including:
 Nihon Jōdai Jiin Keizai-shi no Kenkyū, 1934
 Jiryō Shōen no Kenkyū, 1942
 Ritsuryōsei to Kizoku Seiken

Of particular significance is his complete collection of historical documents spanning three historical Japanese period:
 Nara Ibun, two volumes, 1943-1944; the 1962 revised edition consists of three volumes
 Heian Ibun, 16 volumes, 1947-1980
 Kamakura Ibun, 46 volumes, 1971-1995

Notes

References
 
 

Historians of Japan
20th-century Japanese historians
1907 births
1997 deaths
Academic staff of Kyushu University
University of Tokyo alumni